The 2013 Wellington local elections were part of the 2013 New Zealand local elections, to elect members to sub-national councils and boards. The Wellington elections cover one regional council (the Greater Wellington Regional Council), eight territorial authority (city and district) councils, three district health boards, and various community boards and licensing trusts.

Wellington City Council
The Wellington City Council consists of a mayor and fourteen councillors elected from five wards (Northern, Onslow-Western, Lambton, Eastern, Southern) using the Single Transferable Vote system.

Mayor

Eastern ward
The Eastern ward returns three councillors to the Wellington City Council. The final iteration of results for the ward were:

Lambton ward
The Lambton ward returns three councillors to the Wellington City Council. The final iteration of results for the ward were:

Northern ward
The Northern ward returns three councillors to the Wellington City Council. The final iteration of results for the ward were:

Onslow-Western ward
The Onslow-Western ward returns three councillors to the Wellington City Council. The final iteration of results for the ward were:

Southern ward
The Southern ward returns two councillors to the Wellington City Council. The final iteration of results for the ward were:

References

Wellington
Politics of the Wellington Region
Wellington
2010s in Wellington